The 19th North Dalmatia Division (Serbo-Croatian Latin: Devetnaesta severnodalmatinska divizija) was a Yugoslav Partisan division formed in Biovičino Selo on 4 October 1943. Upon formation it had 3,559 soldiers in three brigades, those being: the 5th, 6th and 7th Dalmatia Brigades. During all of its existence it was a part of the 8th Corps. Commander of the division was Milan Kuprešanin while its political commissar was Petar Babić. The division mostly operated in Dalmatia, Lika and Bosnia.

References 

Divisions of the Yugoslav Partisans
Military units and formations established in 1943